The Schleicher ASK 18 is a single-seat sailplane that was built by the German manufacturer Alexander Schleicher GmbH & Co. It was designed to be a sturdy aircraft for inexperienced solo pilots and so uses a simple and rugged construction and has docile handling characteristics.

Design
The ASK 18 was designed by Rudolf Kaiser and was the last Schleicher glider to use the traditional construction method, at a time when contemporary aircraft of the same class, such as the Grob G102 Astir, were made of glass-fibre. The fuselage was derived from the Ka 8 and used welded steel tube and spruce longerons. It is covered in fabric. The wings are from the Ka 6E but with 16-metre span. They have a single wooden spar. The rear part of the wing is fabric-covered and the ailerons are plywood-covered. The tailplane came from the K 10; the fin and tailplane are plywood-covered and the rudder and elevators are fabric covered. A Flettner trim tab is fitted to the elevator. Only the nose cone is glass-fibre. The main-wheel is fixed and has a brake. There is a tail-skid but no nose-skid. The Schempp-Hirth airbrakes extend above and below the wing. First flight was in October 1974.

A variation was the ASK 18B which had a span reduced to 15m. At the end of production in 1977 38 K18s and 9 K18Bs had been built by Schleicher and one unknown variant built from a kit. A further 8 K18-ARs were produced in Argentina.

Specifications

See also

References
Gliders and Sailplanes of the World by Michael Hardy Ian Allan Ltd 1982

External links

Sailplane directory

1970s German sailplanes
Schleicher aircraft
Aircraft first flown in 1974
Shoulder-wing aircraft